Tliltocatl alvarezi is a possible species of spider in the family Theraphosidae (tarantulas). The World Spider Catalog regards it as a nomen dubium (dubious name). The original description, in the genus Citharacanthus as C. alvarezi, was based on a specimen said to be a female, but this is now regarded as a juvenile male. It was transferred to Tliltocatl in 2020.

References

Theraphosidae
Spiders described in 2013
Nomina dubia